Wag na Wag Kang Lalayo is a 1996 Philippine action film co-written and directed by Jose N. Carreon. The film stars Rudy Fernandez and Vina Morales. It is named after Vina's song from her 1995 album Easy to Love.

Cast
 Rudy Fernandez as Genner Ramirez
 Vina Morales as Raquel Garcia
 Tonton Gutierrez as Lawrence
 Eddie Rodriguez as Superintendent
 Robert Arevalo as Mr. Villaroman
 Efren Reyes Jr. as Sonny
 Dick Israel as Pidyong
 Juan Rodrigo as Mike
 Maila Gumila as Bank Auditor
 Rebecca Bautista as Mike's Wife
 Katrina Aguila as Raquel's Niece
 Bianca Aguila as Raquel's Niece
 Renato del Prado as Mang Rufo
 Edwin Reyes as Edwin
 Mike Enriquez as TV Reporter
 Lorna Tolentino as Victoria

References

External links

1996 films
1996 action films
Filipino-language films
Philippine action films
GMA Pictures films
OctoArts Films films